Epiperipatus evansi is a species of velvet worm in the Peripatidae family. This species is a purplish dark brown with a series of bright triangles on each side forming a series of diamonds down its back. Females of this species have 28 pairs of legs and range from 32 mm to 58 mm in length. The type locality is in Guyana.

References

Onychophorans of tropical America
Onychophoran species
Invertebrates of Guyana
Animals described in 1904
Taxa named by Eugène Louis Bouvier